The following lists of events that happened during 1802 in Chile.

Incumbents
Royal Governor of Chile: Joaquín del Pino Sánchez de Rojas

Events
1802 - Bernardo O'Higgins returns to Chile and becomes a gentleman farmer.

Births
1802: José Anacleto Montt Goyenechea, lawyer

References

 
Years of the 19th century in Chile
Years in the Captaincy General of Chile
1800s in the Captaincy General of Chile